Gaël Angoula (born 18 July 1982) is a French former professional footballer who played as a defender. His brother, Aldo Angoula, is also a professional football player.

References

1982 births
Living people
French footballers
French sportspeople of Cameroonian descent
Footballers from Le Havre
Association football defenders
Ligue 1 players
Ligue 2 players
Pacy Ménilles RC players
SC Bastia players
Angers SCO players
Nîmes Olympique players